The lesser maple leaf blotch miner (Phyllonorycter lucidicostella) is a moth of the family Gracillariidae. It is known from Ontario and Québec in Canada and Alabama, Connecticut, Illinois, Kentucky, Pennsylvania, Maine, Michigan, New York, Vermont and North Carolina in the United States.

The wingspan is about 6.5 mm.

The larvae feed on Acer species, including Acer floridanum and Acer saccharinum. They mine the leaves of their host plant. The mine has the form of a tentiform mine on the underside the leaf. The frass is collected into a ball within the mine. The pupa is suspended in a web of silk within the mine.

References

External links
Bug Guide
Phyllonorycter at microleps.org

lucidicostella
Leaf miners
Moths of North America
Moths described in 1859